The Arboretum de Mazeley (1.8 hectares) is an arboretum located in Mazeley, Vosges, Grand Est, France.

See also 
 List of botanical gardens in France

References 
 L'Echo des Chênaies entry (French)
 Capavenir: Mazeley

Mazeley, Arboretum de
Mazeley, Arboretum de